Catocala dilecta is a moth of the family Erebidae first described by Jacob Hübner in 1808. It is found in north-western Africa through southern Europe to Asia Minor.

The wingspan is 78–84 mm. Adults are on wing from July to September.

The larvae feed on the leaves of various Quercus (oak) species. They can be found from April to June. The species overwinters as an egg.

References

External links

Lepiforum e.V.

Moths described in 1808
dilecta
Moths of Europe
Moths of Africa
Moths of Asia
Taxa named by Jacob Hübner